This Is Where It Ends is the fourth and final studio album by American deathcore band All Shall Perish. It was released on July 26, 2011, through Nuclear Blast. The majority of the follow-up to the previous record, Awaken the Dreamers, was recorded and mixed once again at Castle Ultimate Studios in Oakland with producer Zack Ohren. It is the final album to feature bassist Mike Tiner, guitarist Francesco Artusato, and drummer Adam Pierce.

The songs "There Is Nothing Left", "A Pure Evil", "Embrace the Curse", "Spineless", "My Retaliation", "Rebirth", "The Death Plague", and "In This Life of Pain" are all featured and available as downloadable content in Rock Band 3 via the Rock Band Network

Track listing

Charts

Personnel
All Shall Perish
Mike Tiner – bass guitar
Adam Pierce – drums
Francesco Artusato – lead guitar, piano on "In This Life of Pain"
Ben Orum – rhythm guitar
Hernan Hermida – vocals
Production
Zach Ohren – producer
Brent Elliot – artwork

References

2011 albums
All Shall Perish albums
Nuclear Blast albums